The Centralia Union Depot is an Amtrak train station in Centralia, Washington, United States. It is served by the Cascades and Coast Starlight trains.

The track and platforms are owned by BNSF Railway.  Local transit connections are provided by Twin Transit.

History
The station was constructed by the Northern Pacific Railway (NP) and opened in 1912. It is the third station to have been constructed in Centralia since rail service began in 1880.

The large brick structure was built to accommodate a 400% population boom in the area from 1900 to 1914. Only 2 years after its opening, Centralia Union Depot was being served by 44 passenger trains and 17 freight trains daily. The station faced 14 hotels along Tower Avenue, as well as 5 theaters and 8 banks in the downtown core.

NP later merged into the Burlington Northern Railroad (BN) in 1970, and Amtrak began operating passenger rail service on the Seattle–Portland route on May 1, 1971. Amtrak trains initially did not stop in Centralia, but were added during a service change on July 12, 1971. The demise of NP, coupled with increased automobile traffic on Interstate 5 saw the Centralia Union Depot deteriorate, much as the city's downtown core was experiencing economic decline. Local civic leaders recognized the problem during the mid-1980s and began a two-decade project that would see the structure acquired by the city and restored as part of a larger downtown revitalization project.

The 1996 merger of BN with the Atchison, Topeka and Santa Fe Railway to form the BNSF Railway (BNSF) spurred both the city and the state Department of Transportation (Rail Branch) to negotiate with BNSF to acquire the depot. Following its purchase, the city began the design process for the historic restoration which took place as follows:

 Phase 1 (1996) consisted of exterior work.  Stabilize structure deterioration, restore roof dormers that had been removed, install new tile roof, re-point brick exterior, new utilities, new parking lots at each end of the building.
 Phase 2 (2000) consisted of interior work.  New floors, restored mill work and brass fittings, Amtrak ticket office, baggage room, freight room, express building, HVAC, elevator.

The restoration project was completed in April 2002 and celebrated in the city's "Railroad Days" festival.

The depot is listed on the National Register of Historic Places.

References

External links

Twin Transit website
waymarking.com - Centralia Union Depot
Restoration report for Centralia Union Depot - archive.org

Amtrak stations in Washington (state)
Former Northern Pacific Railway stations in Washington (state)
Railway stations on the National Register of Historic Places in Washington (state)
Railway stations in the United States opened in 1912
Centralia, Washington
Transportation buildings and structures in Lewis County, Washington
1912 establishments in Washington (state)
National Register of Historic Places in Lewis County, Washington
Former Union Pacific Railroad stations in Washington (state)
Former Great Northern Railway (U.S.) stations